Victor Delmas (born 31 May 1991) is a French professional rugby union player. He plays at prop for US Colomiers. Delmas was signed by Bath, to provide backup in the tight-head prop position that he specialises. He was expected to join at the end of the 2017/2018 English Premiership rugby season, but was allowed to leave early and made his Bath debut coming on as a sub on 7 April 2018. Delmas previously played for French Pro D2 side US Colomiers. Achieving over 100 appearances.

He was signed by Bath on 28 March 2018. Delmas struggled for game time. Collecting only two appearances from the bench for the English Premiership side. Signing a deal with Biarritz Olympique ahead of the 2019-2020 Rugby union season in France.

References

External links
Eurosport Rugby Profile
Bath Rugby Profile

French rugby union players
Rugby union props
Biarritz Olympique players
Living people
1991 births